Mi Plan Remixes is a remix album by Canadian singer-songwriter Nelly Furtado, released on October 25, 2010 by Nelstar Entertainment. The album consists of twelve remixes of songs from her first Spanish album Mi Plan.

Critical reception

Stephen Thomas Erlewine of AllMusic proclaimed, "while there's nothing quite essential among the remixes, they're all enjoyable and possess a more pronounced beat."

Track listing

Charts

Release history

References

2010 remix albums
Nelly Furtado albums
Spanish-language remix albums
Universal Music Latino remix albums
Latin pop remix albums